Kids from Foreign is the debut studio album by Born Jamericans.

Kids from Foreign was the fifth-best-selling reggae album of 1994. It peaked at No. 188 on the Billboard 200.

Critical reception
The Tampa Bay Times wrote that the group's sound "is strictly reggae and their beats are funky and energetic, making it hard to find a low spot on the whole album."

Track listing

"Instant Death Interlude" - 2:22
"Warning Sign" - 4:43
"So Ladies" - 3:43
"Sweet Honey" - 3:28
"Informa Fe Dead" - 4:26
"Cease & Seckle" - 4:07
"Ain't No Stoppin" - 4:50
"Why Do Girl" - 4:15
"Oh Gosh" - 6:02
"Nobody Knows" - 5:01
"Boom Shak-a-Tack" (Dancehall Remix) - 3:45

References

1994 debut albums
Born Jamericans albums